Kendra Augustine Jocelyne Dacher (born 8 May 1999) is a French freestyle wrestler. She won one of the bronze medals in the 72 kg event at the 2022 European Wrestling Championships held in Budapest, Hungary. She also won one of the bronze medals in the 76 kg event at the 2022 Mediterranean Games held in Oran, Algeria.

Career 

In 2017, she won one of the bronze medals in her event at the Paris International held in Paris, France. In that same year, she also won one of the bronze medals in her event at the European Juniors Wrestling Championships held in Dortmund, Germany.

She competed in the 72 kg event at the 2020 European Wrestling Championships held in Rome, Italy where she was eliminated in her first match. She won the silver medal in the 72 kg event at the 2021 U23 World Wrestling Championships held in Belgrade, Serbia. She competed in the 72 kg event at the 2022 World Wrestling Championships held in Belgrade, Serbia. She won one of the bronze medals in the 72kg event at the 2022 U23 World Wrestling Championships held in Pontevedra, Spain.

Achievements

References

External links 
 

Living people
1999 births
Place of birth missing (living people)
French female sport wrestlers
European Wrestling Championships medalists
Competitors at the 2022 Mediterranean Games
Mediterranean Games bronze medalists for France
Mediterranean Games medalists in wrestling
21st-century French women